Trophy Club is a suburb of the Dallas–Fort Worth metroplex. When established in the 1970s, it was one of the earliest premier planned communities in Texas, built around the only golf course designed by Ben Hogan. It is located west of DFW Airport and south of the western edge of Lake Grapevine, spanning the county line separating Denton and Tarrant along State Highway 114. The population was 13,688 in 2020.

History

The community was developed in 1973 by developers Johnson and Loggins, who created the community as a housing development surrounding the country club. The town was named for the original plan that the country club would house the trophy collections of golf legend Ben Hogan, who designed its golf course. Originally part of Westlake, the town incorporated in 1985. The first Mayor of Trophy Club was James "Jim" P. Carter, who served as Mayor from 1985 until 1999.

Geography

Trophy Club is located at  (33.000507, −97.193181). The town is located on the southwestern edge of Lake Grapevine. According to the United States Census Bureau, the town has a total area of 4.1 square miles (10.5 km2), of which 75% is land and 25% water.

Climate
Trophy Club, like the rest of the Dallas–Fort Worth area, has a humid subtropical climate, with hot, humid summers and generally mild to cool winters.

Demographics

As of the 2020 United States census, there were 13,688 people, 3,891 households, and 3,360 families residing in the town.

Economy

Top employers
According to Trophy Club's 2020 Comprehensive Annual Financial Report, the top employers in the city are:

Government

Town of Trophy Club

Town Council

Trophy Club is governed by a council-manager form of government. The Council consists of seven members: a Mayor and six council members, with the Mayor serving as presiding officer over Council meetings. Council members are elected at-large-by-place for a term of three years. All powers of the Town are vested in the Council, including but not limited to: enacting legislation, adopting budgets and determining policies. The Mayor participates in the discussion and votes on all matters coming before the Council. Additionally, the Mayor, after Council authorization, signs all contracts, conveyances made or entered into by the Town, all bonds, warrants and any other obligations issued under the Town Charter. The Mayor is recognized as the official head of the Town by the courts for the purpose of serving civil process, by the Governor for the purpose of enforcing military law and for all ceremonial purposes.

The Town's elected officials (as of January 12, 2021) are:
 Mayor – Alicia Fleury (2021)
 Council Place 1 and Mayor Pro Tem – Greg Lamont (2021)
 Council Place 2 – Greg Wilson (2021)
 Council Place 3 – Sean Bone (2021)
 Council Place 4 – Karl Monger (2021)
 Council Place 5 – Michael Geraci (2021)
 Council Place 6 – Philip Shoffner (2022)

The Town Council has authority to appoint and remove the Town Manager. The Town Manager acts as the chief administrative officer of the Town and is responsible to the Council for the proper administration of all the affairs of the Town. In addition to the Town Manager, the Council also appoints the Town Attorney and the Town Secretary who acts as secretary to the Council. The current Town Manager is Steve Norwood, and the current Town Secretary is Leticia Vacek.

Education
Schools are operated by the Northwest Independent School District.

Schools are Lakeview Elementary, Samuel Beck Elementary, Medlin Middle School, and Byron Nelson High School.

Notable people

 Tyler Collins (baseball), Detroit Tigers – OF – #18
 Terry Fator, winner of America's Got Talent; now has a show in Las Vegas, Nevada
 Wally Funk, one of the Mercury 13 astronauts
 Larry Hardy, former coach of the Texas Rangers baseball team
 James Hampton, actor
 Tommy Maddox, former quarterback for the Pittsburgh Steelers
 Don Stanhouse, former pitcher for the Texas Rangers, Baltimore Orioles, and other major league baseball teams
 Richard William Taylor, swimmer and Speedo model

See also
 Byron Nelson High School

References

External links
 Town of Trophy Club, TX website
 Trophy Club Texas

Dallas–Fort Worth metroplex
Towns in Denton County, Texas
Towns in Tarrant County, Texas
Towns in Texas
Populated places established in 1973
1973 establishments in Texas